The Marriage (Same Sex Couples) Act 2013 (c. 30) is an Act of the Parliament of the United Kingdom which introduced same-sex marriage in England and Wales.

Background 

Civil partnerships were introduced in the United Kingdom in 2004, allowing same-sex couples and couples of whom one spouse had changed gender to live in legally-recognised intimate partnerships similar to marriage. It also compelled opposite-sex couples to end their marriage if one or both spouses underwent gender change surgery, or if the couple was not recognised in law as having male and female gender.

Following the 2010 General Election, in September 2011, Liberal Democrat Minister for Equalities Lynne Featherstone launched a consultation in March 2012 on how to introduce civil marriage for same sex couples in England and Wales. The consultation closed in June 2012 and, in December 2012, the new Minister for Women and Equalities, Maria Miller, stated that the Government would be introducing legislation "within the lifetime of this Parliament" and that they were "working towards this happening within this Parliamentary Session". The Marriage (Same Sex Couples) Bill was introduced into Parliament on 24 January 2013. The leaders of the three main political parties in the United Kingdom gave their members a free vote in Parliament on the legislation, meaning they would not be whipped to vote for or against it.

The Bill was welcomed by many, including the gay rights campaigning group Stonewall. The organisation Labour Humanists said there was "no credible ethical reason" to oppose gay marriage and Minister for Women and Equalities, Maria Miller, told the House of Commons that the proposals "will strengthen, not weaken" the institution of marriage.

The Bill included a "quadruple lock" to safeguard religious organisations from being forced to conduct same sex marriages.

Summary of the Act

Parliamentary Passage

House of Commons

First reading 
The Bill received its First Reading on 24 January 2013.

Second reading 
The Bill received its Second Reading on 5 February 2013, passing by a large majority of 400 to 175.

The SNP did not vote, as the Bill largely applies to England and Wales only.

Committee stage 
The Bill was examined by the Marriage (Same Sex Couples) Bill Committee, a Public Bill Committee established to scrutinise the Bill line-by-line. The committee made no amendments to the Bill and returned it to the House of Commons on 12 March 2013.

Prior to its scrutiny of the Bill, the Committee heard evidence from a number of witnesses. On 12 February 2013, the Committee heard evidence from the Church of England, the Catholic Bishops' Conference of England and Wales, the Church in Wales, Lord Pannick QC, Baroness Kennedy of the Shaws QC, Stonewall, the Lesbian and Gay Foundation, the Gender Identity Research and Education Society, Liberal Judaism, the Board of Deputies of British Jews, Out4Marriage, the Coalition for Marriage, and Professor Julian Rivers of the University of Bristol Law School.

On 14 February 2013, the Committee heard evidence from the Religious Society of Friends (the Quakers in Britain), the General Assembly of Unitarian and Free Christian Churches, the Methodist Church, the United Reformed Church, Liberty, the Equality and Human Rights Commission, the Cooperative Group, Schools OUT, the PSHE Association, Jeffrey John, Alice Arnold, Brendan O'Neill, and Mark Jones of Ormerod Solicitors.

Members of the Public Bill Committee included:

Report stage 
The Bill was examined by the House of Commons as a whole during the Report Stage on 20 and 21 May 2013. During the Report Stage, a number of amendments were made to the Bill:

 A new clause was inserted which makes clear that chaplains who are employed by a non-religious organisation (such as in a hospital or a university) who refuse to conduct a same sex marriage will not contravene anti-discrimination legislation. 
 Clause 8 was amended to state that if the Governing Body of the Church in Wales makes clear that it wishes to conduct same sex marriages, the Lord Chancellor must make an order allowing it to do so, rather than simply having the power to do so.
 Following pressure on the government to open up access to civil partnerships for opposite-sex couples, a new clause was inserted which will require there to be a review of the operation and future of the Civil Partnership Act 2004 in England and Wales as soon as practicable.

Third reading 
The Bill received its Third Reading in the House of Commons on 21 May 2013, passing with a majority of 366 to 161.

House of Lords

First reading 
The Bill received its First Reading in the House of Lords on 21 May 2013.

Second reading 
The Bill passed its Second Reading in the House of Lords on 3 and 4 June 2013, after a vote of 390 (72%) votes to 148 (28%) rejected a wrecking amendment that would have denied it a second reading. The bill was supported (and the amendment rejected) by a majority from every party having representation in the House.

The House of Lords – whose members at the time averaged an age of 69 – primarily acts as a reviewing chamber, and the second reading is often in effect about the principles of a bill. The bill was therefore expected to be faced with a difficult hurdle, including strong, vocal opposition. A rarely used "wrecking" motion was tabled by Lord Dear, to effectively reject the bill in full, in place of its second reading. Speakers opposed to the bill described it as a breach of tradition, undemocratic, against religion, and ill thought out. Supporters of the bill included peers who were themselves in long-term same-sex relationships (Lord Alli, Baroness Barker, Lord Black of Brentwood, Lord Smith of Finsbury), and a fourth whose daughter was in a same-sex relationship, as well as heterosexual peers such as Lord Jenkin who had been supportive of gay rights for decades. Nine of the 14 Anglican bishops attending voted for the amendment and five abstained.

The final vote of almost 3–1 against the amendment, and in favour of the bill as it stood, was described by media and other observers as "very remarkable", "crush[ing]" and "overwhelming".

Committee stage 
The Bill underwent its Committee Stage in the House of Lords on 17, 19 and 24 June 2013. A number of government amendments to the Bill were agreed during the Committee Stage:

 Clause 5 was amended to detail the relevant governing authorities for giving consent to same-sex marriages according to the rights and usages of the Jewish religion;
 Schedule 7 would now also amend the Marriage Act 1949 to make clear that a same-sex marriage carried out by the Church of England, or by a religious organisation that had not opted in to solemnising same sex marriages would be void;
 Schedule 7 would now also amend the Public Order Act 1986. Part 3A of the 1986 Act prohibits stirring up hatred against people based on their sexual orientation. Part 3A would be amended to make clear that any discussion or criticism of marriage which concerns the sex of the parties to marriage shall not be taken of itself to be threatening or intended to stir up hatred.

Report stage 
The Bill underwent its Report Stage in the House of Lords on 8 and 10 July 2013. A number of government amendments to the Bill were agreed during the Report Stage:
 Clause 2 was amended to define more specifically what is meant by the term "compelled";
 Schedule 5 was amended to provide for a new fast-track procedure for granting applications for gender recognition for those in protected marriages who transitioned over six years ago;
 A new clause was inserted which would allow the government to make secondary legislation permitting belief-based organisations (such as humanists) to solemnise marriages, following a public consultation.

Third reading 
The Bill had its Third Reading on 15 July 2013, and was passed by a simple voice vote.

The amended Bill returned to the House of Commons for approval of the amendments on 16 July 2013, which the House approved on the same day.

Royal Assent
The Queen Elizabeth II granted Royal Assent to the Bill on 17 July 2013, thereby becoming the Marriage (Same Sex Couples) Act 2013.

Commencement

17 July 2013: Royal Assent 
Sections 15, 16 and 21 came into force on the day the Act received Royal Assent, 17 July 2013. The remaining, substantive provisions of the Act were brought into force by statutory instruments made by the Secretary of State.

31 October 2013: Power to Make Subordinate Legislation 

The Marriage (Same Sex Couples) Act 2013 (Commencement No. 1) Order 2013 brought into force various provisions of the Act on 31 October 2013:

 Section 4 and schedule 1 but only to the extent that these provisions conferred or related to the power to make subordinate legislation. Section 4 and schedule 1 allow religious organisations to perform same sex marriages if they opt in to do so. Subordinate legislation was required to provide details on the application procedure for religious buildings to register to conduct same-sex marriages;
 Paragraphs 5, 8 and 14 of schedule 4 but only to the extent that these provisions conferred or related to the power to make subordinate legislation. Paragraphs 5 and 8 amended the Domicile and Matrimonial Proceedings Act 1973 to set out the jurisdiction of courts in proceedings for orders relating to the ending of a marriage (divorce, judicial separation, nullity of marriage or because one of the couple is dead) and orders relating to declarations of validity of the marriage. Subordinate legislation was required to set out the jurisdiction of the courts to deal with divorce, judicial separation and nullity cases and about the recognition of such orders for a married same-sex couple where one of the couple is or has been habitually resident in a member state of the European Union (EU), or is an EU national, or is domiciled in a part of the UK or the Republic of Ireland. The subordinate legislation brought the jurisdiction in line with that contained within EU law which applies to opposite-sex couples. Paragraph 14 amended the Social Security Contributions and Benefits Act 1992 so that subordinate legislation could be made to provide a particular retirement benefit - the graduated retirement benefit - is available to surviving spouses in same-sex marriages in the same way it is available to widows, widowers and surviving civil partners;
 Section 14;
 Sections 17(1) to (3);
 Sections 18, 19 and 20;
 Paragraphs 1 and 2(2) of schedule 2. Paragraphs 1 and 2(2) allow for subordinate legislation to be made which provides that same-sex marriages conducted in England and Wales are to be recognised in Scotland (until same-sex marriage is permitted in Scotland) and Northern Ireland as civil partners; and
 Paragraphs 27(3) and (4) of schedule 4. Paragraphs 27(3) and (4) allow for subordinate legislation to be made which contains exceptions to the equivalence in law between opposite-sex marriages and same-sex marriages.

21 January 2014: Power to Make Subordinate Legislation 
The Marriage (Same Sex Couples) Act 2013 (Commencement No. 2 and Transitional Provision) Order 2014 brought into force a number of provisions for the purposes of making secondary legislation on 21 January 2014:

 Section 6 (marriages in naval, military and air force chapels); and
 Schedule 6 (marriages overseas).

13 March 2014: Same-Sex Marriage 
The Marriage (Same Sex Couples) Act 2013 (Commencement No. 2 and Transitional Provision) Order 2014 brought into force the vast majority of the provisions which allowed same-sex couples to marry on 13 March 2014. As the law requires couples to wait at least 16 days after giving notice to the local register office before a marriage ceremony can take place, the first marriages took place on 29 March 2014. An exception was where the Registrar General has waived the notice period because one member of the couple was seriously ill and not expected to recover. Such marriages could take place at any time after 13 March 2014. Same-sex couples who married abroad under foreign law and who were previously treated as civil partners were recognised as married as of 13 March 2014. The provisions which came into force on 13 March 2014 were:

 Sections 1 to 5;
 Sections 7 and 8;
 Sections 10(1) and (2);
 Section 11;
 The remainder of Schedule 1;
 The remainder of Schedule 2;
 Schedule 3;
 Schedule 4 (with some minor exceptions); and
 Schedule 7 (with some minor exceptions).

29 March 2014: Marriage Ceremonies 
The first same-sex marriages took place on 29 March 2014.

3 June 2014: Marriage in British Consulates in Armed Forces Bases Overseas and in Military Chapels 
The Marriage (Same Sex Couples) Act 2013 (Commencement No. 2 and Transitional Provision) Order 2014 brought into force a number of provisions on 3 June 2014 which allow same-sex couples to marry in certain British consulates in armed forces bases overseas, and potentially allow for same-sex marriages in military chapels. The provisions which came into force on 3 June 2014 were:
 The remainder of section 6;
 Section 13;
 The remainder of schedule 6; and
 Minor provisions within schedule 7.

10 December 2014: Conversion of Civil Partnerships and Marriage of Transgender Persons 
The Marriage (Same Sex Couples) Act 2013 (Commencement No. 4) Order 2014 brought into force all remaining provisions of the Act on 10 December 2014, those including the provisions which allow for couples in a civil partnership to convert their civil partnership into a marriage (section 9) and for individuals in a marriage or a civil partnership to change their gender without first needing to divorce or dissolve the civil partnership (section 12 and schedule 5).

UK Crown Dependencies and Territories 
Same-sex marriage is legal within Bermuda (subject to appeal), Cayman Islands (subject to appeal), Isle of Man, Indian Ocean Territory, British Antarctic Territory, Akrotiri and Dhekelia (UK Military personnel only), Saint Helena, Ascension and Tristan da Cunha, South Georgia and the South Sandwich Islands, Gibraltar, Channel Islands, Pitcairn Islands and the Falkland Islands.

 Recognition of same-sex unions in the British Overseas Territories

After
In 2013 it was reported that the Conservative Party lost an estimated 35-40% of its membership due to the Same Sex Marriage Bill.

See also 
Timeline of same-sex marriage
Same-sex marriage in the United Kingdom
Marriage and Civil Partnership (Scotland) Act 2014

References

External links
Marriage (Same Sex Couples) Act 2013
UK Gay marriage guide

Same-sex marriage in the United Kingdom
Same-sex union legislation
United Kingdom Acts of Parliament 2013
2013 in LGBT history
LGBT law in the United Kingdom
Marriage law in the United Kingdom
Acts of the Parliament of the United Kingdom concerning England
Acts of the Parliament of the United Kingdom concerning Wales
LGBT in Wales
LGBT in England
2013 in England
2013 in Wales